The 1969 Hamilton Tiger-Cats season was the 12th season for the team in the Canadian Football League and their 20th overall. The Tiger-Cats finished in 3rd place in the Eastern Conference with an 8–5–1 record, but lost the Eastern Semi-Final to the Toronto Argonauts.

Regular season

Season standings

Season schedule

Post-season

Awards and honours
Garney Henley, CFL All-Star
Ellison Kelly, CFL All-Star

References

Hamilton Tiger-cats Season, 1969
Hamilton Tiger-Cats seasons